Rock Hall may refer to:

Rock Hall, Barbados, a populated place
Rock Hall, Maryland, a town in the United States
Rock Hall, Northumberland, a country house in the United Kingdom
Rock Hall (Lawrence, New York), house museum
Rock Hall (Colebrook, Connecticut), hotel, historic building

See also
Rock and Roll Hall of Fame in Cleveland, Ohio

Architectural disambiguation pages